Amity Business School is a private business school in India offering management programs at graduate, post graduate and doctoral levels. It is part of Amity education group and affiliated with UGC India.

History
Amity Business School was established in 1999 by the Ritnand Balved Education Foundation.

Amity Global Business School is also a part of AUUP.

Programs offered
Bachelor of Business Administration
Master of Business Administration with specialisations in Entrepreneurship/Marketing & Sales/Human Resources and Retail Management
Ph.D in Management

Controversies
In 2005, the Government of India informed that the All India Council of Technical Education (AICTE) had withdrawn approval for Amity Business School's PGDM (full-time) and PGDM (part-time) courses. AICTE decided subsequently to transfer the then students of Amity Business School to neighbouring institutions. The decision was taken up after several visits by an AICTE Expert Committees to the Amity Business School in Noida, which found "serious deficiencies and violation of Norms and Standards". The institution was found conducting a "large number of unapproved courses in the same premises," some that required mandatory AICTE approval. A Live Mint-Wall Street Journal report in 2008 confirmed that "AICTE was accurate in observing facilities and infrastructure intended for AICTE-approved courses were being utilized for other unapproved courses." The institute had contravened building laws and also did not have the required "built-up area" as required by AICTE norms. Additionally, the lack of transparency in the institution's admission process and charging of "exorbitant fees" were also quoted as reasons for the withdrawal of the approval.
As per a 2009 Central Information Commission appeal ruling, German judicial authorities have issued arrest warrants against Ashok Kumar Chauhan and Arun Kumar Chauhan, directors of the Amity group of institutions on charges of fraud in Germany. The Interpol too has issued Red-Corner notices. The Ministry of Home Affairs in India has been requested to act on this issue "in accordance with law". The Union Minister for External Affairs in India has accepted that Germany wishes to prosecute Ashok Chauhan and Arun Chauhan and that they have sought legal assistance for extraditing the two.
In September 2006, Outlook magazine apologized to its readers for a paid advertisement released by Amity Business School in its magazine and clarified that Amity Business School had not been part of the Outlook B-school survey. The report confirmed that "the school has been refused approval by the AICTE which has been challenged in the courts."

References

External links
Official website of Amity
Article in The Telegraph, Calcutta
Business Today Ranking 2009

Business schools in Uttar Pradesh
Universities and colleges in Noida
Educational institutions established in 1999
1999 establishments in Uttar Pradesh